Lomographa claripennis is a moth in the family Geometridae first described by Inoue in 1977. It is found in Japan and Taiwan.

References

Moths described in 1977
Lomographa
Moths of Japan
Moths of Taiwan